This is a list of members of the South Australian Legislative Council from 1927 to 1930

 Labor MLC Andrew Kirkpatrick died on 19 August 1928. Frank Condon won the resulting by-election on 27 October.
 Labor MLC John Carr died on 6 June 1929. Stanley Whitford won the resulting by-election on 17 August. Whitford was elected as an unendorsed Labor candidate after the party declared the initial preselection ballot void and did not endorse a candidate in the safe Labor seat; upon taking his seat, he sat with the Labor Party.

References
Parliament of South Australia — Statistical Record of the Legislature

Members of South Australian parliaments by term
20th-century Australian politicians